A State of Trance 2005 is the second compilation album by Dutch DJ and record producer Armin van Buuren. It was released on 12 March 2005 by Armada Music and Ultra Music.

Track listing 
Disc one – Light
 Interstate – "I Found You"
 Hidden Logic presents Luminary – "Wasting"
 Markus Schulz featuring Anita Kelsey – "First Time"
 Max Graham featuring Jessica Jacobs – "I Know You're Gone"
 Mike Foyle presents Statica – "Space Guitar"
 Ava Mea – "In the End"
 Elevation – "Ocean Rain"
 Locust – "Aerospace [Probspot Remix]"
 Armin van Buuren – "Shivers"
 EnMass – "Beyond Horizon"
 Kyau vs. Albert – "Falling Anywhere [Rework]"
 Fragile featuring Alex Lemon – "Inertia [Armin van Buuren Remix]"
 Sophie Sugar – "Call of Tomorrow [John O'Callaghan Remix]"
 Marcos – "Cosmic String" **
 John Askew – "Mood Swing" **

Disc two – Dark
 Peter Martin presents Anthanasia – "Simply Blue"
 Nufrequency – "808 (Why Oh Why) [Instrumental Mix]"
 Andy Moor – "Halcyon"
 Ahmet Ertenu – "Why [Derek Howell Mix]"
 O. Lieb vs. DJ Preach – "Papel [Preach Remix]"
 Remy – "Crackdown"
 Gabriel & Dresden – "Arcadia"
 Tilt – "Twelve [Max Graham Remix]"
 Matthew Dekay – "Deep Show"
 Recluse – "Emotional Void"
 Adam White featuring Martin Grech – "Ballerina"
 Blank & Jones – "Perfect Silence [E-Craig 212 Vocal Mix]"
 Kyau vs. Albert – "Made of Sun [KvA Hard Dub – AVB Edit]"
 M.I.K.E. – "Massive Motion" **
 Eye Wall – "Bad Deal" **
 Hammer & Bennett – "Language [Santiago Nino Dub Tech Mix]" **
 Liquid Overdose – "Ancient Space [Fred Baker Remix]" **

** Tracks not available on the US release.

Release history

Armin van Buuren compilation albums
Electronic compilation albums
2005 compilation albums
Armada Music compilation albums